Plymouth Playhouse, also known as ABC Album, is a half-hour American television anthology series that aired in 1953.

History 
Fifteen episodes aired on the American Broadcasting Company (ABC) from April 12, 1953, to June 21, 1953. Some of the productions were live while others were pre-recorded. It was hosted by David Cook.  ABC, CBS, and NBC used the program to audition possible series in the hopes of gaining sponsorship for the 1953 TV season.

Spin-off programs 
Three of the episodes went on to become series of their own: Colonel Humphrey Flack (1953–54), starring Alan Mowbray on DuMont TelevisionJamie (1953–54), starring Brandon deWilde on ABC Justice (1954–55), starring Paul Douglas and Lee Grant on NBC

Guest stars 
Other guest stars included Eva Marie Saint, Robert Preston (actor), Boris Karloff, Vincent Price, Eddie Albert, Lee Marvin, Jane Wyatt, Gary Merrill, and Wendell Corey.  Directors included two later Academy Award-nominated feature directors, Martin Ritt, and Ralph Nelson.

External links

Plymouth Playhouse at CVTA with episode list

1950s American anthology television series
1953 American television series debuts
1953 American television series endings
American Broadcasting Company original programming
Black-and-white American television shows